Madavoor CM Makham is a famous holy place and a pilgrim destination in Calicut district, Koduvally , Kerala, India.cm nte പൂർണ്ണ നാമം ചിറ്റടിമീത്തൽ എന്നാണ്

History

Name ;സിഎം അബൂബക്കർ മുസ്‌ലിയാർ (ഖ:സി:)

Madavoor Dargah is the birth and death place of the mystic leader and Muslim scholar C.M. Muhammed Aboobacker Musliyar(Malayalam: സി.എം. അബൂബക്കർ മുസ്ലിയാർ (ഖ:സി:)). The dargah is visited by sunni Muslim pilgrims. People from other religions are not allowed to enter the Dargah Premise.

Uroos Festival
The anniversary of the death of C.M Aboobacker Musliyar takes place here every year on shawal 4-8 (according to hijri calendar) as CM Makham Uroos.

Educational Organizations
There are a lot of educational institutions including orphanages for boys and girls run by Madavoor CM Makham. These free education to all kinds of students. Jamiya Ash'ariyya Arts College also under the trust of makham shareef, with more than 200 students with the guidance of 13 scholars prominently  Sayyid Muhammad Jifri Muthukoya Thangal (samasta Kerala president).

Transportation
Madavoor  Dargah connects to other parts of India through Calicut city on the west and Thamarassery town on the east.  National highway No.66 passes through Kozhikode and the northern stretch connects to Mangalore, Goa and Mumbai.  The southern stretch connects to Cochin and Trivandrum.  The eastern National Highway No.54 going through Adivaram connects to Kalpetta, Mysore and Bangalore. The nearest airports are at Kannur and Kozhikode.  The nearest railway station is at Kozhikode.

Sources

References

Dargahs in India
Sufi shrines in India
Sunni cemeteries
Sunni mosques in India
Thamarassery area